Veriora is a small borough in Põlva County, southeastern Estonia. It is the administrative centre of Veriora Parish.

Gallery

References 

Boroughs and small boroughs in Estonia
Veriora Parish
Kreis Werro